William Stephen Goulden "Willy" Bach, Baron Bach (born 25 December 1946) is a British Labour member of the House of Lords. He was a Parliamentary Under-Secretary of State in the Ministry of Justice from 2008 to 2010. He resigned from the opposition front bench when he was elected the Leicestershire Police and Crime Commissioner on 6 May 2016. He did not stand again at the 2021 PCC election and was succeeded by the Conservative Rupert Matthews.

Early life
Bach was educated at Westminster School, then an all-boys public school located within the precincts of Westminster Abbey. He studied at New College, Oxford, graduating with a Bachelor of Arts (BA) degree. In 1972, he was called to the Bar, and then worked as a barrister. He went on to become head of barristers' chambers at King Street Chambers in Leicester on the Midland Circuit in 1996. He also was a councillor in Leicester and Harborough.

Political career
Bach was the unsuccessful Labour parliamentary candidate for Gainsborough in  1979 and for Sherwood in both the 1983 and 1987 general elections.

On 27 July 1998, Bach was created a  life peer, as Baron Bach, of Lutterworth in the County of Leicestershire, where he lives. He was appointed a Government Whip in the Lords in 1999, thereby enjoying the office as one of Her Majesty's Lords in Waiting.

From November 2000, Lord Bach served as a Parliamentary Under-Secretary of State in the Lord Chancellor's Department, until June 8, 2001 when, after the general election, Lord Bach replaced The Baroness Symons of Vernham Dean as Parliamentary Under-Secretary of State for Defence Procurement.

During Lord Bach's tenure, the United Kingdom was involved in choosing between the Boeing X-32 and Lockheed X-35 designs for the Joint Strike Fighter project. Highlighting the level of British participation in the project, Lord Bach was present at the United States Department of Defense announcement that Lockheed Martin had won the competition. Lord Bach was also at the signing of "Type Acceptance" – essentially, the release into service – of the RAF's Typhoon platform.

Following the 2005 general election, Lord Drayson succeeded Lord Bach at the Ministry of Defence, and Lord Bach was transferred to the Department for Environment, Food and Rural Affairs as Parliamentary Under-Secretary of State responsible for Sustainable Farming and Food. He held this post until 2006, when he returned to the back benches. As of 5 October 2008, Lord Bach was brought back into government as Parliamentary Under-Secretary of State for Justice replacing former Lord Hunt of Kings Heath OBE.

Lord Bach was chairman of the SELEX Sensors and Airborne Systems SpA Board of Directors and Director (UK) of Italian arms company Finmeccanica until 2007, when he  resigned from the board in order to return to his role as a government whip. In October 2008, Lord Bach was promoted to become a Parliamentary Under-Secretary of State in the Ministry of Justice, where he served until May 2010.

In October 2013, Lord Bach became a Shadow Foreign and Commonwealth Office Minister on the Official Opposition frontbench headed by Ed Miliband. On 3 December 2014, he took on the additional role of Shadow Attorney General following the resignation of Emily Thornberry. He was replaced by Catherine McKinnell after the election of Jeremy Corbyn as Labour Party leader.

The Bach Commission 
The Bach Commission was founded at the end of 2015, and worked to find evidence on the current legal aid crisis in the UK justice system. Lord Bach chairs this commission, with Sir Henry Brooke as vice-chair. The Commission argued that LASPO had severely affected access to justice, and identified six key features in the justice system to demonstrate this.

Personal life 
In Who's Who, Lord Bach listed his interests as watching cricket and football (he is a supporter of Leicester City FC). He is married, with three children.  He is also a great-nephew of suffragette Emmeline Pankhurst.

References

External links 
 Announcement of his introduction at the House of Lords

1946 births
Alumni of New College, Oxford
Councillors in Leicestershire
English barristers
Labour Party (UK) Baronesses- and Lords-in-Waiting
Labour Party (UK) life peers
Living people
People educated at Westminster School, London
Labour Party police and crime commissioners
Labour Party (UK) councillors
Life peers created by Elizabeth II